The Islamabad Capital Territory (ICT) is the only federal territory of Pakistan containing Islamabad, the capital of Pakistan. Located on the northern edge of the Pothohar Plateau and at the foot of the Margalla Hills, The ICT shares borders with the province of Khyber Pakhtunkhwa in the west and with the province of Punjab in the remaining directions. It covers an area of 1,165 square kilometres (450 sq mi) and according to the 2017 national census, had a population of over 1 million in the city proper, while over 2 million in the whole territory. The territory is represented in the National Assembly by NA-52, NA-53, and NA-54 constituencies and by four seats in the Senate.

History

In 1960, land was transferred from Rawalpindi District of Punjab province to replace Karachi Federal Capital Territory and establish Pakistan's new capital. According to the 1960s master plan, the Capital Territory included Rawalpindi, and was to be composed of the following parts:
 Rawalpindi, 
 Islamabad, 
 Margalla Hills, 
 Islamabad rural, 

However, Rawalpindi was eventually excluded from the Islamabad master plan in the 1980s.

Administration

Zones

Islamabad is subdivided into five zones:

Zone I: Designated for urban development and federal government institutions
Zone II: Designated for urban development
Zone III: Designated for rural development
Zone IV: Designated for rural development
Zone V: Designated for rural development

Sectors

Union councils

Islamabad Capital Territory comprises urban and rural areas. The rural consists of 23 union councils, comprising 133 villages, while urban has 27 union councils.

Climate

Seasons 
The climate of Islamabad has a humid subtropical climate (Köppen: Cwa), with five seasons: winter (November–February), spring (March and April), summer (May and June), rainy monsoon (July and August), and autumn (September and October).

Temperatures 
The hottest month is June, where average highs routinely exceed , while the coolest month is January. Winters generally feature dense fog in the mornings and sunny afternoons. In the city, temperatures stay mild, with snowfall over the higher elevations points on nearby hill stations, notably Murree and Nathia Gali.

Precipitation 
The wettest month is July, with heavy rainfalls and evening thunderstorms with the possibility of cloudburst and flooding. On 23 July 2001, Islamabad received a record breaking  of rainfall in just 10 hours. It was the heaviest rainfall in Islamabad in the past 100 years and the highest rainfall in 24 hours as well. The city has also experienced snowfall on a number of occasions.
Islamabad's micro-climate is regulated by three artificial reservoirs: Rawal, Simli, and Khanpur Dam.

Vegetation 

Cityscape

Civic administration

The main administrative authority of the city is Islamabad Capital Territory Administration with some help from Metropolitan Corporation Islamabad and Capital Development Authority (CDA), which oversees the planning, development, construction, and administration of the city. Islamabad Capital Territory is divided into eight zones: Administrative Zone, Commercial District, Educational Sector, Industrial Sector, Diplomatic Enclave, Residential Areas, Rural Areas and Green Area.

Islamabad city is divided into five major zones: Zone I, Zone II, Zone III, Zone IV, and Zone V. Out of these, Zone IV is the largest in area. All sectors of Ghouri Town (1, 2, 3, VIP, 5, 4-A, 4-B, 4-C, 5-A, 5-B and sector 7) are located in this zone. Zone I consists mainly of all the developed residential sectors, while Zone II consists of the under-developed residential sectors. Each residential sector is identified by a letter of the alphabet and a number, and covers an area of approximately 4 square kilometres. The sectors are lettered from A to I, and each sector is divided into four numbered sub-sectors.

Sectors 
Series A, B, and C are still underdeveloped. The D series has seven sectors (D-11 to D-17), of which only sector D-12 is completely developed. This series is located at the foot of Margalla Hills. The E Sectors are named from E-7 to E-17. Many foreigners and diplomatic personnel are housed in these sectors. In the revised Master Plan of the city, CDA has decided to develop a park on the pattern of Fatima Jinnah Park in sector E-14. Sectors E-8 and E-9 contain the campuses of Bahria University, Air University, and the National Defence University. The F and G series contains the most developed sectors. F series contains sectors F-5 to F-17; some sectors are still under-developed. F-5 is an important sector for the software industry in Islamabad, as the two software technology parks are located here. The entire F-9 sector is covered with Fatima Jinnah Park. The Centaurus complex will be one of the major landmarks of the F-8 sector. G sectors are numbered G-5 through G-17. Some important places include the Jinnah Convention Center and Serena Hotel in G-5, the Red Mosque in G-6, and the Pakistan Institute of Medical Sciences, the largest medical complex in the capital, located in G-8.

The H sectors are numbered H-8 through H-17. The H sectors are mostly dedicated to educational and health institutions. National University of Sciences and Technology covers a major portion of sector H-12. The I sectors are numbered from I-8 to I-18. With the exception of I-8, which is a well-developed residential area, these sectors are primarily part of the industrial zone. Currently two sub-sectors of I-9 and one sub-sector of I-10 are used as industrial areas. CDA is planning to set up Islamabad Railway Station in Sector I-18 and Industrial City in sector I-17. Zone III consists primarily of the Margalla Hills and Margalla Hills National Park. Rawal Lake is in this zone. Zone IV and V consist of Islamabad Park, and rural areas of the city. The Soan River flows into the city through Zone V.

Demographics

Language

While urban Islamabad is home to people from all over Pakistan as well as expatriates, in the rural areas a number of Pothohari speaking tribal communities can still be recognised.

Religion

Islamabad-Rawalpindi metropolitan area

When the master plan for Islamabad was drawn up in 1960, Islamabad and Rawalpindi, along with the adjoining areas, was to be integrated to form a large metropolitan area called Islamabad/Rawalpindi Metropolitan Area. The area would consist of the developing Islamabad, the old colonial cantonment city of Rawalpindi, and Margalla Hills National Park, including surrounding rural areas. However, Islamabad city is part of the Islamabad Capital Territory, while Rawalpindi is part of Rawalpindi District, which is part of province of Punjab.

Initially, it was proposed that the three areas would be connected by four major highways: Murree Highway, Islamabad Highway, Soan Highway, and Capital Highway. However, to date, only two highways have been constructed: Srinagar Highway (formerly known as Murree Highway and later as Kashmir Highway) and Islamabad Highway. Plans of constructing Margalla Avenue are also underway. Islamabad is the hub all the governmental activities while Rawalpindi is the centre of all industrial, commercial, and military activities. The two cities are considered sister cities and are highly interdependent.

Economy

Islamabad is a net contributor to the Pakistani economy, as whilst having only 0.8% of the country's population, it contributes 1% to the country's GDP. Islamabad Stock Exchange, founded in 1989, is Pakistan's third largest stock exchange after Karachi Stock Exchange and Lahore Stock Exchange. The exchange has 118 members with 104 corporate bodies and 18 individual members. The average daily turnover of the stock exchange is over 1 million shares. As of 2012, Islamabad LTU (Large Tax Unit) was responsible for Rs 371 billion in tax revenue, which amounts to 20% of all the revenue collected by Federal Board of Revenue.

Islamabad has seen an expansion in information and communications technology with the addition two Software Technology Parks, which house numerous national and foreign technological and information technology companies. The tech parks are located in Evacuee Trust Complex and Awami Markaz. Awami Markaz houses 36 IT companies while Evacuee Trust house 29 companies. Call centres for foreign companies have been targeted as another significant area of growth, with the government making efforts to reduce taxes by as much as 10% to encourage foreign investments in the information technology sector. Most of Pakistan's state-owned companies like PIA, PTV, PTCL, OGDCL, and Zarai Taraqiati Bank Ltd. are based in Islamabad. Headquarters of all major telecommunication operators such as PTCL, Mobilink, Telenor, Ufone, and China Mobile are located in Islamabad. Being an expensive city, the prices of most of fruits, vegetable and poultry items increased in Islamabad during the year 2015-2020

Tourism

Transport

Airport 
Islamabad is connected to major destinations around the world through the Islamabad International Airport. The airport is the largest in Pakistan, handling 9 million passengers per annum. The airport was built at a cost of $400 million and opened on 3 May 2018, replacing the former Benazir Bhutto International Airport.

Metrobus 
The Rawalpindi-Islamabad Metrobus is a  bus rapid transit system that serves the twin cities of Rawalpindi and Islamabad in Pakistan. It uses dedicated bus lanes for all of its route covering 24 bus stations. Islamabad is well connected with other parts of the country through car rental services such as Alvi Transport Network and Pakistan Car Rentals.

Motorways 
All major cities and towns are accessible through regular trains and bus services running mostly from the neighbouring city of Rawalpindi. Lahore and Peshawar are linked to Islamabad through a network of motorways, which has significantly reduced travelling times between these cities. Islamabad is linked to Rawalpindi through the Faizabad Interchange, which has a daily traffic volume of about 48,000 vehicles.

Education
Islamabad has the highest literacy rate of Pakistan at 95%. Islamabad also has some of Pakistan's major universities, including Quaid-i-Azam University, the International Islamic University, and the National University of Sciences and Technology and Pakistan Institute of Engineering and Applied Sciences

Private School Network Islamabad is working for private educational institutions. The president of PSN is Dr. Muhammad Afzal Babur from Bhara Kahu. PSN is divided into eight zones in Islamabad. In Tarlai Zone Chaudhary Faisal Ali from Faisal Academy Tarlai Kalan is Zonal General Sectary of PSN.

Quaid-e-Azam University has several faculties. The institute is located in a semi-hilly area, east of the Secretariat buildings and near the base of Margalla Hills. The nucleus of the campus has been designed as an axial spine with a library as its center.
Other universities include the following:

 Abasyn University Islamabad Campus
 Bahria University
 Air University
 Quaid-e-Azam University
 Allama Iqbal Open University (AIOU)
 Alkauthar Islamic University
 COMSATS Institute of Information Technology (CIIT)
 Capital University of Science and Technology (CUST) [Formally Mohammad Ali Jinnah University, Islamabad Campus]
 Federal Urdu University of Arts, Science & Technology (FUUAST)
 National University of Sciences and Technology (NUST)
 National Defense University, Islamabad(NDU)
 National University of Modern Languages (NUML)
 Institute of Space Technology
 International Islamic University Islamabad
 Institute of Cost and Management Accountants of Pakistan (ICMAP)
 Pakistan Institute of Development Economics (PIDE)
 Pakistan Institute of Engineering and Applied Sciences (PIEAS)
 Shifa College of Medicine
 Foundation University Islamabad (FUI)
 National University of Computer & Emerging Sciences(FAST-NUCES)
 Riphah International University
 University of Lahore
 Center for Advanced Studies in Engineering
 Preston University Islamabad Campus
 Iqra University Islamabad Campus
 Shaheed Zulfiqar Ali Bhutto Institute of Science and Technology (ZABIST)
 Hamdard University Islamabad Campus
 The Millennium Universal College Islamabad Campus

Sports
Islamabad United became the first ever team to win Pakistan Super League in 2016. And now the federal team Is participating in the Pakistan Cup.

See also

 Islamabad Capital Territory Administration
 List of cultural heritage sites in Islamabad Capital Territory
 Developments in Islamabad
 Model Town Humak

References

External links

Islamabad Capital Territory Administration website

Capital Development Authority
Green Lake City Islamabad

 
Subdivisions of Pakistan
Capital districts and territories
States and territories established in 1960
1960 establishments in Pakistan